Hugh Peterson (August 21, 1898 – October 3, 1961) was a U.S. political figure and lawyer from the state of Georgia.

Life 
Peterson was born near Ailey, Georgia in 1898 and attended the Brewton–Parker Institute in Mount Vernon, Georgia and the University of Georgia in Athens. He studied law, gained admission to the state bar in 1921 and began the practice of law in Mount Vernon. In 1922, Peterson served as the Mayor.

From 1923 through 1931, Peterson served in the Georgia House of Representatives. In 1931, he became a state Senator and served in that position until 1932. In 1934, Peterson was elected to the 74th United States Congress as a Democratic member of the United States House of Representatives representing Georgia's 1st congressional district. He served five additional terms in that seat until losing his re-election campaign in 1946.

After his congressional service, Peterson returned to Ailey to practice law. He died on October 3, 1961, in Sylva, North Carolina and was buried in the Peterson family plot in Ailey.

Peterson was married to Patience Elizabeth Russell, daughter of Richard Russell Sr. and sister of Richard Russell Jr. and Robert Lee Russell.

References 
 

1898 births
1961 deaths
Democratic Party Georgia (U.S. state) state senators
Georgia (U.S. state) lawyers
Mayors of places in Georgia (U.S. state)
Democratic Party members of the Georgia House of Representatives
University of Georgia alumni
Democratic Party members of the United States House of Representatives from Georgia (U.S. state)
People from Montgomery County, Georgia
People from Mount Vernon, Georgia
Brewton–Parker College alumni
20th-century American politicians
20th-century American lawyers